Aix-Marseille University (AMU; ; formally incorporated as Université d'Aix-Marseille) is a public research university located in the Provence region of southern France. It was founded in 1409 when Louis II of Anjou, Count of Provence, petitioned the Pisan Antipope Alexander V to establish the University of Provence, making it one of the oldest university-level institutions in France. The institution came into its current form following a reunification of the University of Provence, the University of the Mediterranean and Paul Cézanne University. The reunification became effective on 1 January 2012, resulting in the creation of the largest university in the French-speaking world, with about 80,000 students. AMU has the largest budget of any academic institution in the Francophone world, standing at €750 million. It is consistently ranked among the top 200 universities in the world and is ranked within the top 4 universities in France according to CWTS and USNWR, and 5th in the country according to ARWU.

The university is organized around five main campuses situated in Aix-en-Provence and Marseille. Apart from its major campuses, AMU owns and operates facilities in Arles, Aubagne, Avignon, Digne-les-Bains, Gap, La Ciotat, Lambesc and Salon-de-Provence. The university is headquartered in the 7th arrondissement of Marseille.

AMU has produced many notable alumni in the fields of law, politics, business, science, academia and arts. To date, there have been four Nobel Prize laureates amongst its alumni and faculty, as well as a two-time recipient of the Pulitzer Prize, four César Award winners, multiple heads of state or government, parliamentary speakers, government ministers, ambassadors and members of the constituent academies of the Institut de France.

AMU has hundreds of research and teaching partnerships, including close collaboration with the French National Centre for Scientific Research (CNRS) and the French Alternative Energies and Atomic Energy Commission (CEA). AMU is a member of numerous academic organisations including the European University Association (EUA) and the Mediterranean Universities Union (UNIMED).

History

Early history (1409–1800)

The institution developed out of the original University of Provence, founded on 9 December 1409 as a studium generale by Louis II of Anjou, Count of Provence, and recognized by papal bull issued by the Pisan Antipope Alexander V. However, there is evidence that teaching in Aix existed in some form from the beginning of the 12th century, since there were a doctor of theology in 1100, a doctor of law in 1200 and a professor of law in 1320 on the books. The decision to establish the university was, in part, a response to the already-thriving University of Paris. As a result, in order to be sure of the viability of the new institution, Louis II compelled his Provençal students to study in Aix only. Thus, the letters patent for the university were granted, and the government of the university was created. The Archbishop of Aix-en-Provence, Thomas de Pupio, was appointed as the first chancellor of the university for the rest of his life. After his death in 1420, a new chancellor was elected by the rector, masters, and licentiates – an uncommon arrangement not repeated at any other French university. The rector was to be an "ordinary student", who had unrestricted civil and criminal jurisdiction in all cases where one party was a doctor or scholar of the university. Those displeased with the rector's decisions could appeal to a doctor legens. Eleven consiliarii provided assistance to the rector, being elected yearly by their predecessors. These individuals represented all faculties, but were elected from among the students. The constitution was of a student-university, and the instructors did not have great authority except in granting degrees. A resident doctor or student who married was required to pay charivari to the university, the amount varying with the degree or status of the man, and being increased if the bride was a widow. Refusal to submit to this statutable extortion was punished by the assemblage of students at the summons of the rector with frying-pans, bassoons, and horns at the house of the newly married couple. Continued recusancy was followed by the piling up of dirt in front of their door upon every Feast-day. These injunctions were justified on the ground that the money extorted was devoted to divine service.

In 1486 Provence passed to the French crown. The university's continued existence was approved by Louis XII of France, and Aix-en-Provence continued to be a significant provincial centre. It was, for instance, the seat of the Parliament of Aix-en-Provence from 1501 to 1789, no doubt aided by the presence of the law school.

In 1603 Henry IV of France established the Collège Royal de Bourbon in Aix-en-Provence for the study of belles-lettres and philosophy, supplementing the traditional faculties of the university, but not formally a part of it. This college de plain exercice became a significant seat of learning, under the control of the Jesuit order. Throughout the 16th and 17th centuries, the college frequently served as a preparatory, but unaffiliated, school for the university. Only the university was entitled to award degrees in the theology, law, and medicine; but candidates for degrees had first to pass an examination in philosophy, which was only provided by the college. Universities basically accepted candidates who had studied in colleges formally affiliated with them, which in reality required both college and university to be situated in the same city. In 1762 the Jesuits were forced to leave France, and in 1763 the Collège Royal de Bourbon was officially affiliated with the university as a faculty of arts.

The addition of the Collège Royal de Bourbon essentially widened the scope of courses provided at the University of Provence. Formal instruction in French was initially provided at the college, with texts and a structured course of study. Subsequently, physics became a part of the curriculum at the college as a part of the philosophy course in the 18th century. Equipment for carrying out experiments was obtained and the first course in experimental physics was provided at Aix-en-Provence in 1741. Classical mechanics, however, was only taught after 1755, when the physicist Paulian offered his first class and Isaac Newton's Philosophiæ Naturalis Principia Mathematica and commentaries were obtained for the library.

The French Revolution, with its focus on the individual and an end to inherited privilege, saw the suppression of the universities. To the revolutionaries, universities embodied bastions of corporatism and established interests. Moreover, lands owned by the universities and utilized for their support, represented a source of wealth to be tapped by the revolutionary government, just as property possessed by the Church had been confiscated. In 1792, the University of Provence, along with twenty-one other universities, was dissolved. Specialized ecoles, with rigorous entrance examinations and open to anyone with talent, were eventually created in order to offer professional training in specialized areas. Nonetheless, the government found it necessary to allow the faculties of law and medicine to continue in Aix-en-Provence and Marseille in the early 19th century.

Modern era (1800–1968)

During the 19th century, additional faculties were opened in Aix-en-Provence and Marseille to serve the changing needs of French society. For instance, Hippolyte Fortoul, later Minister of National Education and Public Worship of France, was the first dean and professor of a new faculty in French literature established in Aix-en-Provence in the 1840s. In 1896, the departmental council of the Bouches-du-Rhône founded a chair in the faculty of letters at Aix-en-Provence in the language and literature of Southern Europe; their aim was to assist the commercial exploitation of the region by French business. A new science faculty was created in Marseille to support the growing industrialization of the region. At about the same time, a special training program was created in the faculty of medicine in order to train doctors in colonial medicine for France's expanding colonial empire.

The most significant development for the university in the 19th century, nevertheless, was the recreation of French universities in 1896.  The various faculties in Aix-en-Provence and Marseille were grouped into the new University of Aix-Marseille.

Through two world wars and a depression, the University of Aix-Marseille continued to develop. Increasing numbers of women and foreign students joined the student body, and an overwhelming majority of students majored in the science, medicine, and law. Individual faculties were almost autonomous from university administration and the Ministry of Education frequently intervened directly among the faculties.

Recent history (1968–present)

Following riots among university students in May 1968, a reform of French education occurred. The Orientation Act (Loi d'Orientation de l'Enseignement Superieur) of 1968 divided the old faculties into smaller subject departments, decreased the power of the Ministry of Education, and created smaller universities, with strengthened administrations. Subsequently, the University of Aix-Marseille was divided into two institutions. Each university had different areas of concentration of study and the faculties were divided as follows:
 University of Aix-Marseille I: law, political science, history, psychology, sociology, ethnology, philosophy, mathematics, physics, chemistry, natural sciences, languages, literature and civilization
 University of Aix-Marseille II: economic science, geography, technology, medicine, pharmacy, dental surgery, topical medicine, physical education and ocean science  
In 1973, conservative faculty members led by Charles Debbasch, demanded and obtained the creation of the University of Aix-Marseille III, grouping law, political science, applied economics, earth science, ecology and technological studies.

Nearly 40 years later, in June 2007, the three universities of Aix-Marseille expressed their intention to reunite in order to form one university. The reunification was gradually prepared, respecting a schedule which allowed for long discussions at each stage, after which it was approved by vote of the Board of Directors of each university. Thus, Aix-Marseille University was re-established by decree No. 2011–1010 of 24 August 2011 and officially opened its doors on 1 January 2012.

Organization 

Aix-Marseille University is organized into five sectors:
 Law and Political Science
 Faculty of Law and Political Science
 Institute of Public Management and Territorial Governance
 Economics and Management
 Faculty of Economics and Management
 School of Journalism and Communication
 Aix-Marseille Graduate School of Management
 Regional Institute of Labour
 Arts, Literature, Languages and Human Sciences
 Faculty of Arts, Literature, Languages and Human Sciences
 Training Centre for Musicians
 Mediterranean House of Human Sciences
 Faculty of Medical and Paramedical Sciences
 Faculty of Dentistry
 Faculty of Pharmacy
 Sciences and Technology
 Faculty of Sciences
 Faculty of Sports
 Pytheas Institute – Earth Sciences and Astronomy Observatory
 Polytech Marseille
In addition, the University Institute of Technology and Institute of Teaching and Education are part of the university.

Governance

AMU is governed by the President, the Vice Presidents, the General Director of Services and Deputy Directors General of Services and the Accounting Officer. They meet on a weekly basis to discuss the main affairs of the university and to devise the strategic orientations which will be examined by the university councils. A second meeting with all the deans and directors takes place immediately afterwards to discuss more specific issues regarding internal activities of the various faculties and schools. The Administrative Council comprises 30 members: academics, teaching staff, administrative and technical personnel, students and external members. Its role is to determine the university general policy. The Academic Council consists of two bodies: The Research Committee, composed of 40 members, drafts policy proposals for research, scientific and technical documentation, and the allocation of research funding. The Education and Student Life Committee, composed of 40 members, drafts policy proposals on the curriculum, on requests for authorization and projects for new programs, and on the assessment of programs and teaching.

If the President of the university is the most important actor in defining the mission and the strategies of the university, he also has the necessary power to impulse or to sustain the projects that relate to these strategies. Before implementing these projects, they have to be accepted by the university council and if necessary they have to be included in the planning processes. There are two main planning processes in the definition of projects in the university that have to be followed in order to be financed or even authorised and accredited by the public (national and local) authorities. The first process takes place every six years and involves the central government, the region as well as the university. It is devoted to major investment projects, for instance building a new school, a new campus, a new library, etc. It is a catalogue of projects and for each of them it defines the financial burden accepted by each partner in the contract. The second process covers four years and has to be approved by the French Ministry of Education. In this process, the university sets its objectives at the pedagogical and research levels (new degrees, research projects). This planning process is very important because the university is free to define its own strategy, to be approved by the decision makers. Each process generates an important brainstorming period at all levels of the university in order to identify and build new ideas, new needs, and opportunities, to prioritise them, after an analysis of strengths and weaknesses. Other choices can be made after each process is closed, but they are more difficult to implement because other sources of funding and other ways of authorisation must be found.

Academic profile

Aix-Marseille University enrolls about 80,000 students, including more than 10,000 international students from 128 different countries. The university, with its wide range of general and vocational courses including 600 degree courses, offers teaching in fields as varied as the Arts, Social Sciences, Health, Sport and Economics, Law and Political Sciences, Applied Economics and Management, and Exact Sciences such as Mathematics, Data-processing, Physical Sciences, Astrophysical Sciences, Chemistry and Biology. Its 132 recognized research units and 21 faculties make it a centre of international excellence in social and natural sciences. With more than 500 international agreements, the university participates in the creation of European area of education and research and in the development of mobility. A policy in the direction of Asian countries has led to increase its enrollments of excellent international students. Programmes in French and/or English have been organized in order to favour the welcome and the integration of international students, in particular thanks to the presence within the university of the University Service of French as a Foreign Language (SUFLE). Its predecessor, the Institute of French Studies for Foreign Students (Institut d'Etudes Françaises Pour Etudiants Etrangers (IEFEE)) was founded in 1953 and was regarded as one of the best French-language teaching centres in the country. About a thousand students from 65 countries attend the SUFLE throughout the academic year. It is also a notable centre for teachers of French as a foreign language, and its function is to provide training and perfecting of linguistic abilities in French as a scientific and cultural means of communication. According to Harvard University's website, the university is "one of the most distinguished in France, second only to the University of Paris in the areas of French literature, history, and linguistics".

The university's library system comprises 59 libraries, with 662,000 volumes, 20,000 online periodical titles, and thousands of digital resources, making it one of the largest and most diverse academic library systems in France. The overall area occupied by the libraries is equal to 37,056 m2, including 19,703 m2 public access space. The libraries offer 49.2 kilometers of open-stacks shelving and 4,219 seats for student study. In addition, there are 487 computer workstations, which are available to the public for research purposes.

Political Science

The university's Institute of Political Studies (Institut d'études politiques d'Aix-en-Provence), also known as Sciences Po Aix, was established in 1956. It is one of a network of 10 world-famous IEPs (Instituts d'Etudes Politiques) in France, including those in Bordeaux, Grenoble, Lille, Lyon, Paris, Rennes, Saint-Germain-en-Laye, Strasbourg and Toulouse. Sciences Po Aix is a grande école in political science and its primary aim is to train senior executives for the public, semi-public, and private sectors. Although the institute offers a multitude of disciplines, its main focus is on politics, including related subjects such as history, law, economics, languages, international relations, and media studies. Its admissions process is among the toughest and most selective in the country. Sciences Po Aix has numerous exchange programs through partnerships with about 120 different universities in the world: the school therefore welcomes 200 foreign students a year. On top of these academic exchanges, students have the opportunity to do internships abroad in large international firms.

Many of the institute's graduates have gone on to high positions within both the French government and in foreign governments. Among the best-known people who studied at Sciences Po Aix are the current President of the European Central Bank (ECB), Christine Lagarde, former High Representative of the Union for Foreign Affairs and Security Policy and Vice-President of the European Commission, Federica Mogherini, the 5th President of Sri Lanka, Chandrika Kumaratunga, former Minister of Justice of France, Élisabeth Guigou, former Presidents of the National Assembly of France, Philippe Séguin and Patrick Ollier.

Law

 
The law school at AMU dates back to the university's foundation in 1409. The school had far-reaching influence, since written law, which in France originated in Aix-en-Provence, spread from there, eventually replacing the common law practiced throughout the rest of Northern Gaul. The law school has a long tradition of self-management, with a strongly institutionalized culture and practices enrooted in the social and economic realities of the region. Today, it is one of the largest law schools in France, and is considered to be one of the nation's leading centres for legal research and teaching. The school is unique among French law schools for the breadth of courses offered and the extent of research undertaken in a wide range of fields. For 2021/22, the law school is ranked 3rd nationally for its undergraduate studies by Eduniversal. According to the University of Connecticut's website, "other than the Sorbonne, Aix has attracted the most prestigious law faculty in France". The teaching faculty comprises 155 professors and 172 adjunct lecturers, the latter drawn from private practice, the civil service, the judiciary and other organizations.  Much of the legal research at the university is done under the auspices of its many research institutes – there is one in almost every field of law. Research activity is buttressed by a network of libraries, which holds an impressive collection of monographs and periodicals, including an important collection of 16th-century manuscripts. Moreover, the libraries have several specialized rooms dedicated to specific fields of law, in particular in International and European Law and Legal Theory.

The school has produced a large number of luminaries in law and politics including the 2nd President of France, Adolphe Thiers, former Prime Minister of France, Édouard Balladur, former President of the National Assembly of France, Félix Gouin, and former Minister of Justice of France, Adolphe Crémieux. The school has also educated two Nobel laureates: René Cassin, winner of the 1968 Nobel Peace Prize, and Frédéric Mistral, winner of the 1904 Nobel Prize in Literature. Alumni also include the 3rd President of Lebanon, Émile Eddé, former Prime Minister of Bulgaria, Vasil Kolarov, former Prime Minister of Angola, Fernando José de França Dias Van-Dúnem, and former Prime Minister of Cambodia, Norodom Ranariddh. In addition, from 1858 to 1861, a prominent French artist and Post-Impressionist painter Paul Cézanne attended the school, while also receiving drawing lessons.

Business and Management Studies
The Aix-Marseille Graduate School of Management, commonly known as IAE Aix-en-Provence, was the first Graduate School of Management in the French public university system. According to The Independent, IAE Aix is "a prestigious, double-accredited institution, with an international approach to business combining both classic and innovative teaching methods". It is the only French public university entity to receive dual international accreditation: the European standard of excellence EQUIS in 1999, and the AMBA accreditation in 2004 for its MBA Change & Innovation, in 2005 for its master's programmes and in 2007 for its Executive Part-time MBA. The school is composed of 40 permanent faculty members, and invites more than 30 international professors and 150 business speakers each year to conduct lectures and courses within the various programmes. IAE Aix offers graduate level programmes in general management, international management, internal audit of organisations, service management, internal and external communications management, management and information technologies, international financial management and applied marketing. In 2011, the M.Sc. in General Management was ranked 2nd in France along with the M.Sc. in Services Management and Marketing being ranked 3rd and the M.Sc. in Audit and Corporate Governance also being ranked 3rd in the country by SMBG.

In 1990, IAE Aix and ESSEC Business School (École supérieure des sciences économiques et commerciales) signed an agreement to unite and offer a joint Doctorate Programme, allowing ESSEC professors to teach in the Research Oriented Master programme in Aix-en-Provence. Furthermore, after Research Oriented Master graduation, students can attend the ESSEC Doctorate seminars and have an ESSEC Research Advisor (Directeur de Recherche). In the same way, ESSEC students can enroll in the IAE Aix's Research Oriented Master and Doctorate programmes. In both cases, the members of the thesis juries come from both IAE Aix and ESSEC. The Doctorate title is awarded by Aix-Marseille University.

Economics
Aix-Marseille School of Economics (AMSE) is a gathering of three big laboratories in economics, part of AMU: GREQAM (Groupement de Recherche en Economie Quantitative d'Aix Marseille), SESSTIM (Sciences Économiques & Sociales de la Santé & Traitement de l'Information Médicale), and IDEP (Institut D’Economie Publique). GREQAM is a research center which specializes in all areas of economics, with strong concentrations in macroeconomics, econometrics, game theory, economic philosophy and public economics. It counts two Fellows of the Econometric Society among its members, and is consistently ranked as one of the top five research centers in economics in France. SESSTIM consists of three teams in social and economic sciences, as well as social epidemiology, focusing on applications in the following fields: cancer, infectious and transmissible diseases, and aging. IDEP aims at federating competences in the field of Public Economics broadly defined as the part of economics that studies the causes and the consequences of public intervention in the economic sphere.

AMSE has a triple aim in terms of research development about "Globalization and public action", education regarding Master and PhD degrees and valorization toward local authorities, administrations and corporations, and of information aiming at all public. The AMSE Master is a two-year Master programme in Economics jointly organized with the School for Advanced Studies in the Social Sciences and École Centrale de Marseille. It aims to provide high-level courses and training in the main fields of specialization of AMSE: Development Economics, Econometrics, Public Economics, Environmental Economics, Finance/Insurance, Macroeconomics, Economic Philosophy, and Health Economics. The doctoral programme of AMSE brings together more than seventy PhD students. Ten to fifteen new PhD students join the programme each year. These PhD students cover all the research topics available at AMSE. The PhD programme is a member of the European Doctoral Group in Economics (EDGE) with the University of Cambridge, the University of Copenhagen, University College Dublin, Bocconi University, and Ludwig Maximilian University of Munich.

Medicine

The Faculty of Medicine at AMU can trace its origins to a college of medicine established in 1645 and recognized by a decree issued by the Council of State of France in 1683. During the revolution, although a faculty of medicine was created in Montpellier, Marseille was left aside, probably because of its close proximity. In 1818, École Secondaire de Médecine et de Pharmacie opened in Marseille and this later became an École de Plein Exercice in 1841. Consequently, it was not until 1930 that a faculty of medicine was formally organised in Marseille. However, the town's geographical position meant that it was able to exert a strong influence upon the Mediterranean. The most significant example of this was Antoine Clot, known as Clot Bey, who with the help of Muhammad Ali of Egypt, founded a school of medicine in Cairo in 1827. This enabled Egyptian students to travel to France and encouraged exchanges between western and eastern medicine. In Marseille, medical practices adapted to tropical diseases developed under the influence of the military department of medicine. Physiology at the faculty dates back to Charles-Marie Livon, who was named professeur suppléant (deputy professor) and then professeur agrégé (associate professor) of anatomy and physiology having presented his thesis in Paris. He conducted research on hypophysis and pneumogastric physiology, which earned him the Monthyon Prize at the French Academy of Sciences. Following his work with Louis Pasteur, he opened an anti-rabies clinic and became Mayor of Marseille in 1895. The first dean of the faculty was Leon Imbert, who arrived in Marseille in 1904 as a former interne des hôpitaux and professeur agrégé at the Montpellier faculty. Originally a surgeon, he established one of the first centers for maxillofacial prosthetics for the gueules cassées (broken faces) of the Great War. An anti-cancer center was developed by Lucien Cornill, who was originally from Vichy and studied in Paris. During the First World War, he worked at the neurological center in the 7th Military region of Besançon under the supervision of Gustave Roussy. After the war, he became a professeur agrégé of pathological anatomy. He became dean of the faculty in 1937 and held this position until 1952. His main work related to clinical neurology and medullary pathology.

The Faculty of Pharmacy started its independent activity after being separated from the faculty in 1970. Subsequently, the Faculty of Dentistry also became independent from the Faculty of Medicine. Thus, these three faculties form the Division of Health of the university.

Earth Sciences and Astronomy

The university's Astronomy Observatory of Marseille-Provence (OAMP) is one of the French National Observatories under the auspices of the National Institute of Astronomy (INSU) of the National Centre for Scientific Research (CNRS), with a large financial participation by the National Centre for Space Studies (CNES). Basic research at the OAMP is organized around three priority themes: cosmology and research on dark matter and dark energy, galaxy formation and evolution, stellar and planetary system formation and exploration of the solar system. The OAMP also contributes to the area of environmental sciences and especially the study of the climatic system. The OAMP is very active in technological research and development, mainly in optics and opto-mechanics, for the development of the main observational instruments that will be deployed on the ground and in space in the coming decades. For many years OAMP research teams have had close ties with the French and European space and optical industry. The OAMP takes part in university education in astrophysics, physics and mathematics, as well as in instrumentation and signal processing from the first year of university to the doctorate level. These programs lead to openings in the fields of research and high-tech industry. The OAMP organizes many astronomy outreach activities in order to share important discoveries with the public. The OAMP consists of two establishments: the Laboratory of Astrophysics of Marseille (LAM) and the Haute-Provence Observatory (OHP), along with the Département Gassendi, which is a common administrative and technical support unit. With over 50 researchers, 160 engineers, technical and administrative personnel, plus some 20 graduate students and post-docs, the OAMP is one of the most important research institutes in the region.

Engineering
Polytech Marseille is a Grande École d'Ingénieurs (Graduate School of Science and Engineering), part of AMU. The School offers 8 specialist courses in New Technologies which lead to an engineering degree after 5 years of studies. Polytech Marseille is also a member of the Polytech Group which comprises 13 engineering schools of French leading universities. Polytech Marseille's advanced level courses have a strong professional focus. They include compulsory work placements in a professional organisation. These programs also benefit from a top rank scientific environment, with teaching staff drawn from laboratories attached to major French research organisations that are among the leaders in their field. Students are recruited on the basis of a selective admissions process which goes via one of two nationwide competitive admissions examinations (concours): either after the baccalauréat (national secondary school graduation examination) for admission to a five-year course or after two years of higher education for admission to a three-year course. The courses are approved by the Commission des Titres d'Ingénieur (CTI), the French authority that authorizes recognised engineering schools to deliver the Diplôme d'Ingénieur (a state-recognised title, recognised equivalent to a "Master in Engineering" by AACRAO) and thus guarantees the quality of the courses. The courses are also accredited by EUR-ACE.

Rankings and reputation

In the 2015 Academic Ranking of World Universities (ARWU), AMU is ranked joint 101st–150th in the world. In the subject tables it is ranked joint 76th–100th in the world for Natural Sciences and Mathematics, joint 151st–200th in the world for Engineering/Technology and Computer Sciences, joint 101st–150th in the world for Life and Agricultural Sciences, joint 151st–200th in the world for Clinical Medicine and Pharmacy, 25th in the world for Mathematics, and joint 101st–150th in the world for Physics.

In the 2018 Times Higher Education World University Rankings (THE), AMU is ranked joint 251st–300th in the world. In the subject tables it is ranked joint 151st–175th in the world for Arts and Humanities.

In the 2015/16 QS World University Rankings (QS), AMU is ranked joint 361st in the world. In the subject tables it is ranked joint 151st–200th in the world for Accounting and Finance, joint 101st–150th in the world for Earth and Marine Sciences, joint 101st–150th in the world for Environmental Studies, joint 101st–150th in the world for History and Archaeology, joint 151st–200th in the world for Law and Legal Studies,  joint 151st–200th in the world for Medicine, and joint 151st–200th in the world for Psychology.

In the 2016 U.S. News & World Report Best Global University Ranking, AMU is ranked joint 175th in the world. In the subject tables it is ranked joint 74th in the world for Biology and Biochemistry, joint 166th in the world for Chemistry, joint 149th in the world for Clinical Medicine, joint 90th in the world for Geosciences, joint 50th in the world for Immunology, joint 35th in the world for Microbiology, 98th in the world for Neuroscience and Behavior, joint 95th in the world for Physics, 82nd in the world for Plant and Animal Science, joint 134th in the world for Psychiatry/Psychology, and 34th in the world for Space Science.

In the 2016 CWTS Leiden Ranking, AMU is ranked 137th in the world.

In the 2015/16 University Ranking by Academic Performance (URAP), AMU is ranked 77th in the world.

In the 2016 Center for World University Rankings (CWUR), AMU is ranked 151st in the world.

In the 2019 Reuters - The World's Most Innovative Universities ranking, AMU is ranked 96th in the world.

University presses
Aix-Marseille University is affiliated with two university presses: Presses Universitaires de Provence (PUP) and Presses Universitaires d'Aix-Marseille (PUAM); the former is dedicated to the publication of works in the humanities and hard sciences, whereas the latter is devoted to the publication of legal works.

Notable alumni

AMU has produced many alumni that have distinguished themselves in their respective fields. Notable AMU alumni include three Nobel Prize laureates, a two-time recipient of the Pulitzer Prize, four César Award winners and numerous members of the component academies of the Institut de France. AMU has a large number of alumni who have been active in politics, including multiple heads of state or government, parliamentary speakers, government ministers, at least eighty members of the National Assembly of France, twenty members of the Senate of France and nine members of the European Parliament.

Notable faculty and staff

Nobel laureates

 Sheldon Glashow – winner of the 1979 Nobel Prize in Physics

Politics and government

Foreign politicians
 
 Chedly Ayari – Minister of Planning of Tunisia: 1969–1970/1974–1975; Minister of Youth and Sports of Tunisia: Jun–Nov 1970; Minister of Education of Tunisia: 1970–1971; Minister of Economy of Tunisia: 1972–1974   
 Renato Balduzzi – Minister of Health of Italy: 2011–2013
 Boudewijn Bouckaert – Member of the Flemish Parliament: 2009–2014
 Sadok Chaabane – Minister of Justice of Tunisia: 1992–1997; Minister of Higher Education and Scientific Research of Tunisia: 1999–2004
 Tullio De Mauro – Minister of Education of Italy: 2000–2001
 Francis Delpérée – Member of Belgian Senate: 2007–2011 
 Sven Koopmans – Member of the House of Representatives of the Netherlands: 2017–2021
 Nikolaos Politis – Minister of Foreign Affairs of Greece: 1916–1920
 Kenneth F. Simpson – Republican member of the United States House of Representatives: Jan 1941
 Michel van den Abeele – former Director-General of the European Commission

French politicians

 Joseph Barthélemy – Minister of Justice of France: 1941–1943
 Hippolyte Fortoul – Minister of the Navy and Colonies of France: Oct–Dec 1851; Minister of National Education of France/Minister of Public Worship of France: 1851–1856
 Hubert Haenel – French politician, member of the Constitutional Council of France: 2010–2015
 Didier Maus – Councillor of State of France: 2001–2011  
 Jean-Paul Proust – Minister of State of Monaco: 2005–2010; Prefect of Police of Paris: 2001–2004   
 Joseph Jérôme Siméon – President of the National Assembly of France: Aug–Sep 1797; Minister of National Education of France: Feb–Oct 1820; Minister of the Interior of France: 1820–1821; President of the Court of Financial Auditors of France: 1837–1839
 Jean-Jacques Weiss – Councillor of State of France: 1873–1879

Members of the National Assembly of France
 René Brunet – Deputy: 1928–1942 
 Joseph Comiti – Deputy: 1968–1981  
 Paul de Fougères de Villandry – Deputy: 1837–1839  
 Jean-Pierre Giran – Deputy: 1997–2002/2002–2007/2007–2012/2012–2017
 François-Michel Lambert – Deputy: 2012–present
 Rémy Montagne – Deputy: 1958–1968/1973–1980 
 Ambroise Mottet – Deputy: 1835–1842/1844–1848  
 Paul Patriarche – Deputy: 1997–2002
 Camille Perreau – Deputy: 1898–1902 
 Philippe Sanmarco – Deputy: 1981–1993
 Henri-Emmanuel Poulle – Deputy: 1831–1834/1834–1837/1837–1839/1839–1842/1842–1846/1846–1848 
 Dominique Taddéi – Deputy: 1978–1981/1981–1986 
 Maurice Toga – Deputy: 1986–1988

Members of the Senate of France
 Alain Delcamp – Secretary-General: 2007–2013 
 Brigitte Devésa – Senator: 2021–present  
 Claude Domeizel – Senator: 1998–2014
 Michèle Einaudi – Senator: Aug–Sep 2020 
 Hélène Masson-Maret – Senator: 2013–2014

Diplomatic service
 
 Princess Bajrakitiyabha – Thai Ambassador to Austria: 2012–2014
 Gilles-Henry Garault – French Ambassador to Nepal: 2007–2010  
 Jeane Kirkpatrick – United States Ambassador to the United Nations: 1981–1985

Lawyers, judges, and legal academics

 
 Sami A. Aldeeb – Head of the Arab and Islamic Law Department at the Swiss Institute of Comparative Law, and Director of the Center of Arab and Islamic Law
 Harry Blackmun – Associate Justice of the Supreme Court of the United States: 1970–1994
 Jay Bybee – Senior Judge of the United States Court of Appeals for the Ninth Circuit: 2019–present
 Mirjan Damaška – Sterling Professor emeritus at Yale Law School 
 René David – former Chair of Comparative Law at the University of Paris 
 Louis Favoreu – French academic and jurist  
 Barry E. Friedman – American academic with an expertise in federal courts, working at the intersections of law, politics and history
 Giorgio Gaja – Judge of the International Court of Justice (ICJ): 2011–2021
 Alon Harel – the Phillip P. Mizock & Estelle Mizock Chair in Administrative and Criminal Law at the Hebrew University of Jerusalem 
 Geoffrey C. Hazard, Jr. – Trustee Professor of Law at the University of Pennsylvania Law School, the Thomas E. Miller Distinguished Professor of Law at the University of California, Hastings College of the Law, and Sterling Professor Emeritus of Law at Yale Law School
 Ayşe Işıl Karakaş – Turkish academic, judge of the European Court of Human Rights (ECtHR)
 Peter Lindseth – the Olimpiad S. Ioffe Professor of International and Comparative Law and the Director of International Programs at the University of Connecticut School of Law
 Ejan Mackaay – Professor of Law at the Université de Montréal
 Iulia Motoc – Judge at the European Court of Human Rights, former Member of the United Nations Human Rights Committee, former judge of the Constitutional Court of Romania
 John F. Murphy – American lawyer and a professor at Villanova University
 John L. Murray – Chief Justice of Ireland: 2004–2011; Judge of the Supreme Court of Ireland: 1999–present; Judge of the European Court of Justice (ECJ): 1992–1999; Attorney General of Ireland: 1982/1987–1991
 Theo Öhlinger – Member of the Constitutional Court of Austria: 1977–1989
 Francesco Parisi – the Oppenheimer Wolff & Donnelly Professor of Law at the University of Minnesota Law School 
 Raymond Ranjeva – Member of the International Court of Justice (ICJ): 1991–2009; Vice-President of the International Court of Justice (ICJ): 2003–2006
 Hjalte Rasmussen – former professor of EU Law at the University of Copenhagen
 Michel Rosenfeld – Justice Sydney L. Robins Professor of Human Rights, Benjamin N. Cardozo School of Law, Yeshiva University
 Francisco Rubio Llorente – Judge of the Constitutional Court of Spain: 1980–1992; Vice President of the Constitutional Court of Spain: 1989–1992; President of the Spanish Council of State: 2004–2012
 Eli Salzberger – Law Professor at the University of Haifa Faculty of Law
 Antonin Scalia – Associate Justice of the United States Supreme Court: 1986–2016
 Bernhard Schlink – German jurist and writer
 Ronald Sokol – American lawyer and writer
 Alec Stone Sweet – Leitner Professor of Law, Politics and International Studies at Yale Law School
 Symeon C. Symeonides – Dean of the Willamette University College of Law 
 Michael Tigar – American criminal defense attorney

Arts, literature, humanities, and entertainment

Historians
 François Victor Alphonse Aulard – professor of the history of the French Revolution at Sorbonne University
 Gabriel Camps – French historian
 Georges Duby – French historian, member of the French Academy
 Georges Foucart – French historian and Egyptologist 
 Douglas Johnson – British historian, an advisor to the former British Prime Minister Margaret Thatcher on all matters concerning France
 Nora Lafi – French historian 
 Paolo Malanima – Italian economic historian
 George E. Mowry – American historian focusing primarily on the Progressive Era, professor at UCLA and the University of North Carolina at Chapel Hill 
 Jean-Rémy Palanque – professor of ancient history, member of the Académie des Inscriptions et Belles-Lettres 
 Serge Ricard – professor of American Civilization at the University of Paris III: Sorbonne Nouvelle
 Théodore Eugène César Ruyssen – French historian, President of the Peace Through Law Association
 Rafał Taubenschlag – Polish historian of law, a specialist in Roman law and papyrology 
 Paul Veyne – French historian and archaeologist
 Catherine Virlouvet – French historian, a professor of economic and social history of ancient Rome 
 Arundhati Virmani – Indian historian
 Jules Sylvain Zeller – French historian, lecturer at Sorbonne University, member of the Académie des Sciences morales et politiques

Journalism
 Mazarine Pingeot – French journalist, writer and professor, the daughter of former President of France, François Mitterrand
 Lucien-Anatole Prévost-Paradol – French journalist and essayist, member of the French Academy

Literature
 Yves Bonnefoy – French poet and essayist
 Paule Constant – French novelist 
 Louis O. Coxe – American poet, playwright, essayist, and professor
 Frieda Ekotto – Francophone African novelist and literary critic, professor of Afro-American and African Studies and Comparative Literature at the University of Michigan
 Henri Fluchère – chairman of the Société Française Shakespeare and a literary critic
 Raymond Jean – French writer
 François Ricard – Canadian writer, professor of French literature at McGill University
 Émile Ripert – French academic, poet, novelist and playwright
 Urbano Tavares Rodrigues – Portuguese professor of literature, a literary critic and a fiction writer
 Affonso Romano de Sant'Anna – Brazilian poet, essayist, and professor
 Roselyne Sibille – French poet
 William E. Wilson – American writer

Music
 André Bon – French composer
 André Boucourechliev – French composer
 Barry Conyngham – Australian composer and academic
 Jean-Claude Risset – French composer

Scientists and academics

 

 Jean-Claude Abric – professor in social psychology
 Giulio Angioni – Italian writer and anthropologist, professor at the University of Cagliari, fellow of St Antony's College of the University of Oxford
 Nicolas Maurice Arthus – French immunologist and physiologist
 Anthony Barnes Atkinson – Fellow of the British Academy, a senior research fellow of Nuffield College of the University of Oxford and Centennial Professor at the London School of Economics (LSE)
 Sydney Hervé Aufrère – French Egyptologist, archaeologist, and director of research at CNRS
 Philip Augustine – Indian gastroenterologist, specialist in gastrointestinal endoscopy
 Henri Bacry – visiting scholar at the Institute for Advanced Study and a researcher at CERN
 Patrick Baert – Belgian sociologist and social theorist, reader in Social Theory at the University of Cambridge and Fellow of Selwyn College, Cambridge 
 René Baillaud – French astronomer
 Ugo Bardi – professor in physical chemistry at the University of Florence 
 Eugène Benoist – French classical philologist, member of the Académie des Inscriptions et Belles-Lettres
 Reinhold Bertlmann – Austrian physicist, professor of physics at the University of Vienna 
 Eugenio Bianchi – Italian theoretical physicist
 Danielle Bleitrach – French sociologist 
 Maurice Blondel – French philosopher
 David E. Bloom – the Chair of Harvard University's Department of Global Health and Population, professor of Economics and Demography at the Harvard School of Public Health, and Director of the Program on the Global Demography of Aging
 Jean Bosler – French astronomer
 Svetlana Broz – Bosnian–Serbian author and physician, the granddaughter of the 1st President of Yugoslavia, Josip Broz Tito 
 Henri Buisson – French physicist
 François Burgat – French political scientist and arabist, senior research fellow at the French National Centre for Scientific Research, and the Head of the French Institute of the Near East
 Jean Cabannes – French physicist
 Christian Cambillau – French scientist at the CNRS in Structural Biology
 Forrest Capie – professor emeritus of Economic History at the Cass Business School, City University London  
 Carlo Carraro – President of the University of Venice, Director of the Sustainable Development Programme of the Fondazione Eni Enrico Mattei, and Director of the Climate Impacts and Policy Division of the Euro-Mediterranean Center for Climate Change (CMCC)
 Maurice Caullery – French biologist, lecturer at Sorbonne University   
 Jean Chacornac – French astronomer
 Jérôme Eugène Coggia – French astronomer
 Alain Colmerauer – French computer scientist and the creator of the logic programming language Prolog
 Henri Coquand – French geologist and paleontologist 
 Pablo Cottenot – French astronomer
 Brian Lee Crowley – Managing Director of the Macdonald-Laurier Institute, and the founding President of the Atlantic Institute for Market Studies (AIMS)
 Boris Cyrulnik – French doctor, ethologist, neurologist and psychiatrist
 Jacques Daviel – French ophthalmologist, oculist to Louis XV of France, Fellow of the Royal Society, and a foreign member of the Royal Swedish Academy of Sciences
 Christie Davies – British sociologist, professor emeritus of sociology at the University of Reading
 Rajeev Dehejia – professor of public policy in the Robert F. Wagner Graduate School of Public Service at New York University 
 Charles Depéret – French geologist and paleontologist, member of the French Academy of Sciences and the Société géologique de France
 August Alphonse Derbès – French naturalist, zoologist and botanist
 Jean Dufay – French astronomer, member of the French Academy of Sciences
 Jean-Yves Empereur – French archeologist and egyptologist 
 Roger Establet – French scholar of the sociology of education
 Honoré Fabri – French Jesuit theologian, mathematician, physicist and controversialist  
 Charles Fabry – Professor of General Physics at Sorbonne University and the École Polytechnique, co-discoverer of the ozone layer
 Charles Fehrenbach – French astronomer, member of the French Academy of Sciences, and Director of the Observatoire de Haute Provence (OHP)
 John F. Forester – American planning theorist with a particular emphasis on participatory planning, former Chair of the Department of City and Regional Planning at Cornell University
 Jean-Félix Adolphe Gambart – French astronomer
 Jean-Yves Girard – French logician
 Louis Godart – the chair of philology at the University of Naples Federico II 
 Lucien Golvin – French university professor who specialized in the study of art from the peoples of the Maghreb
 Gérard Granel – French philosopher and translator
 Gilles-Gaston Granger – French analytic philosopher
 Pierre Gros – contemporary scholar of ancient Roman architecture and the Latin language
 Maurice Gross – French linguist and scholar of Romance languages 
 Gene Grossman – the Jacob Viner Professor of International Economics at Princeton University
 Alex Grossmann – Croatian-French physicist
 Rudolf Haag – German physicist
 Bernard Harcourt – the chair of the Political Science Department, professor of political science and the Julius Kreeger Professor of Law at the University of Chicago
 Édouard Marie Heckel – French botanist and medical doctor, former director of the Jardin botanique E.M. Heckel, and founder of the Colonial Institute and Museum of Marseille
 Isao Imai – Japanese theoretical physicist
 Charles Joret – French literary historian, philologist and botanical author
 Henri Lucien Jumelle – French botanist 
 Daniel Kastler – French theoretical physicist
 Joseph J. Katz – American chemist at Argonne National Laboratory, member of the US National Academy of Science
 Antoine Émile Henry Labeyrie – French astronomer
 Deepak Lal – the James S. Coleman Professor of International Development Studies at the University of California, Los Angeles (UCLA)  
 Antonio Lanzavecchia – Italian immunologist
 Lucien Laubier – French oceanographer 
 Laurie Menviel - Australian climate scientist & oceanographer
 Jean-Louis Le Moigne – French specialist on systems theory and constructivist epistemology
 Leigh Lisker – American linguist and phonetician
 Carlo Lottieri – Political Philosophy professor
 John Loughlin – Director of the Von Hügel Institute, and a senior fellow and affiliated lecturer in the Department of Politics and International Studies at the University of Cambridge
 Henry de Lumley – French archeologist, geologist and prehistorian
 John L. Lumley – professor emeritus, Graduate Professor of Mechanical Engineering and Aerospace Engineering at Cornell University
 Roger Malina – physicist, astronomer, Executive Editor of Leonardo Publications at the MIT Press 
 Antoine Fortuné Marion – French naturalist
 Audier Marius – the founder of the Institute of Social Gerontology (Institut de Gérontologie Sociale)
 Octave Merlier – expert on the Modern Greek language 
 Antoine Mérindol – French physician, doctor to Louis XIII of France
 Georges Mounin – French linguist, translator and semiotician 
 Gunasekaran Paramasamy – Vice-Chancellor of Thiruvalluvar University
 Jules Payot – French educationist
 Marcin Odlanicki Poczobutt – Polish–Lithuanian Jesuit astronomer and mathematician, former Rector of Vilnius University
 Jean-Louis Pons – French astronomer
 Didier Raoult – French biology researcher
 Charles Rostaing – French linguist specialising in toponymy
 Carlo Rovelli – Italian physicist
 Évry Schatzman – French astrophysicist
 Mark Seidenberg – Hilldale and Donald O. Hebb Professor of Psychology at the University of Wisconsin–Madison and a senior scientist at Haskins Laboratories 
 Samah Selim – Egyptian scholar and translator of Arabic literature
 Bernard Sellato – former Director of the Institute for Research on Southeast Asia
 Étienne Souriau – French philosopher, member of the Académie des sciences morales et politiques
 Paul Souriau – French philosopher
 William H. Starbuck – organizational scientist who held professorships in social relations (Johns Hopkins University), sociology (Cornell University), business administration (University of Wisconsin–Milwaukee), and management (New York University)
 Édouard Stephan – French astronomer
 Nikola Stoyanov – Bulgarian scientist, economist and financier
 Eero Tarasti – Finnish musicologist and semiologist 
 Wilhelm Tempel – German astronomer
 Jose L. Torero – professor in fire safety engineering at the University of Edinburgh
 Nicolas Tournadre – professor specializing in morphosyntax and typology, member of the LACITO lab of the CNRS
 Benjamin Valz – French astronomer
 Jean Varenne – French Indologist 
 Albert Jean Baptiste Marie Vayssière – French scientist
 John Waterbury – American academic, professor of politics and international affairs at Princeton University's Woodrow Wilson School of Public and International Affairs
 Margaret Weitz – professor emeritus at Suffolk University
 Dan Werthimer – co-founder and chief scientist of the SETI@home project
 Józef Maria Hoene-Wroński – Polish philosopher 
 Francisco José Ynduráin – Spanish theoretical physicist
 Andrey Zaliznyak – Russian linguist
 Christoph Zürcher – professor of Political Science at the Free University of Berlin

Business and economics
 
 Georges Anderla – French economist
 Bruce Caldwell – Research Professor of Economics at Duke University, and Director of the Center for the History of Political Economy
 Jean-Pierre Danthine – Swiss-Belgian economist, Vice President of the Swiss National Bank
 Lars Feld – Director of the Walter Eucken Institut, professor for Economic Policy at the University of Freiburg, and member of the German Council of Economic Experts
 Garance Genicot – Belgian-American economist, associate professor of economics at Georgetown University
 Rick Gilmore – President/CEO of GIC Trade, Inc. (the GIC Group), Special external advisor to the White House/USAID for the private sector/global food security and managing director of the Global Food Safety Forum (GFSF) in Beijing
 Victor Ginsburgh – Belgian economist
 Sanjeev Goyal – Indian economist, professor of economics at the University of Cambridge and Fellow of Christ's College, Cambridge
 Nancy Hubbard – American professor of business, author, and Miriam Katowitz Chair of Management and Accounting at Goucher College
 Richard Lyons – the 14th Dean of the Haas School of Business, University of California, Berkeley
 Angus Maddison – British economist, former emeritus professor at the Faculty of Economics at the University of Groningen
 Gérard Mestrallet – Chairman and CEO of Engie: 2008–2016
 Henry Mintzberg – academic and author on business and management, the Cleghorn Professor of Management Studies at the Desautels Faculty of Management of McGill University
 Abhiroop Mukhopadhyay – Indian economist 
 Nikolay Nenovsky – Bulgarian economist
 Pierre Pestieau – Belgian economist
 George Selgin – the Director of the Cato Institute's Center for Monetary and Financial Alternatives, professor emeritus of economics at the Terry College of Business at the University of Georgia, and an associate editor of Econ Journal Watch
 Mark P. Taylor – the Dean of Warwick Business School (WBS) at the University of Warwick and an academic in the fields of International Finance and Economics
 Paul Tiffany – Senior Lecturer at the Haas School of Business, University of California, Berkeley 
 Lawrence H. White – American economics professor at George Mason University
 Myrna Wooders – Canadian economist, professor of economics at Vanderbilt University and the University of Warwick

Mathematics
 Sergio Albeverio – Swiss mathematician working in the field of differential equations and mathematical physics
 Peter Balazs – Austrian mathematician working at the Acoustics Research Institute Vienna of the Austrian Academy of Sciences
 Yvonne Choquet-Bruhat – French mathematician and physicist, who was the first woman to be elected to the French Academy of Sciences
 Joachim Cuntz – German mathematician, fellow of the American Mathematical Society   
 Roland Fraïssé – French mathematical logician
 John H. Hubbard – American mathematician, professor at Cornell University 
 Henri Padé – French mathematician, known for his development of approximation techniques for functions using rational functions
 Étienne Pardoux – French mathematician working in the field of Stochastic analysis, in particular Stochastic partial differential equations
 Olivier Ramaré – French mathematician
 Nicolas Sarrabat – French mathematician and scientist, the son of the painter Daniel Sarrabat   
 Jean-Marie Souriau – French mathematician, known for works in symplectic geometry 
 Masamichi Takesaki – Japanese mathematician, professor at the University of California, Los Angeles (UCLA) and fellow of the American Mathematical Society
 David Trotman – British mathematician, leading expert in an area of singularity theory known as the theory of stratifications 
 André Weil – French mathematician, known for his foundational work in number theory and algebraic geometry

Miscellaneous
 Robert Chaudenson – French linguist, a specialist in creole languages
 Alain Colmerauer – French computer scientist
 Jean-François Delmas – French librarian, chief curator of the Bibliothèque Inguimbertine and the Musées de Carpentras
 Michel Duc-Goninaz – member of the World Esperanto Youth Organization (TEJO), and co-editor of La Folieto
 Roger Duchêne – French biographer specializing in the letters of Madame de Sévigné
 Leonard Liggio – classical liberal author, research professor of law at George Mason University, and executive vice president of the Atlas Economic Research Foundation in Fairfax, Virginia
 Tuncer Őren – Turkish/Canadian systems engineer, professor emeritus of Computer Science at the School of Electrical Engineering and Computer Science of the University of Ottawa 
 Rascas de Bagarris – founder of the science of historical numismatics and one of the most notable antiquaries of his time
 Willy Ronis – French photographer

See also 
 List of early modern universities in Europe 
 List of medieval universities
 List of oldest universities in continuous operation

References

External links 
 www.univ-amu.fr Official website of Aix-Marseille University
Scholars and Literati at the University of Aix (1409–1793), Repertorium Eruditorum Totius Europae – RETE

 
Universities and colleges in Aix-en-Provence
Universities and colleges in Marseille
University Aix-Marseille
Law schools in France
Universities and colleges formed by merger in France
Educational institutions established in 1896
1896 establishments in France